HMS Trent was a  launched in 1877.  She was the fifth ship of the Royal Navy to be named after the River Trent. She was renamed HMS Pembroke in 1905, and served off the coast of Tanganyika in 1915.  She was renamed HMS Gannet in 1917 while serving as a diving tender. She was scrapped in 1923.

Design
The Medina class were a development of the Rendel (or "flat-iron") gunboat, a series of small vessels with low freeboards which mounted a small number of relatively large guns.  Although the Medinas were exceptionally provided with masts to extend their range and independence, in essence they were available for similar operations to their un-masted sisters; offensive action against shore defences.  Their ungainly appearance led them to be described by the naval historian Antony Preston as "the most grotesque craft ever seen".  All 12 vessels of the class were named after rivers. They were constructed entirely of iron and were fitted with an unusual bow rudder.

Armament
As built, ships of the class mounted three 6.3-inch (160-mm) 64-pdr 64-cwt muzzle-loading rifles.  By 1892 Trent had been fitted with a pair of 4.7-inch quick-firing guns.

Propulsion
All the ships of the class were fitted with a pair of R and W Hawthorn 2-cylinder horizontal single-expansion steam engines of 60 nominal horsepower.

Sail plan
All ships of the class were built with three masts and a barquentine rig of sails. Trent had her rig reduced to a pair of pole masts in 1892.

Construction
Trent was launched from the Jarrow yard of Palmers Shipbuilding and Iron Company on 23 August 1877.

Operational career
HMS Trent served as gunnery tender to HMS Wildfire, flagship at Sheerness, and was paid off into the Medway fleet reserve in June 1901. She was re-commissioned at Chatham 21 December 1901 by Boatswain A. S. Robinson for service in the river Medway.

On 11 September 1907 Pembroke, based at Chatham as a depot ship, was rammed by the collier Walton, requiring Pembroke to be docked for repair.

Fate
 
Trent was sold for breaking to the Dover Shipbreaking Company on 21 February 1923.

References

 

1877 ships
Medina-class gunboats
Ships built on the River Tyne
Victorian-era gunboats of the United Kingdom